The American National Bank Building (also known as the Florida National Bank Building, the Seville Tower or Empire Building) is a historic bank in Pensacola, Florida, United States. On November 17, 1978, it was added to the U.S. National Register of Historic Places.  It was designed by New York architect J. E. R. Carpenter.

History
The tower was erected in 1910 at a cost of $250,000. It was the tallest building in Florida at the time of its completion, and remained the tallest in the City of Pensacola until 1974. The building was added to the National Register of Historic Places on 17 November 1978.
Its location on the northeast corner of Palafox and Government Streets, is also the site of the first telephone exchange in Florida with exclusive operating rights, established by Southern Bell on September 1, 1880, and serving 31 telephones.
Seville Tower is currently used as office space.

References

External links 
 Escambia County listings at National Register of Historic Places
 Escambia County listings at Florida's Office of Cultural and Historical Programs

Buildings and structures in Pensacola, Florida
National Register of Historic Places in Escambia County, Florida
Bank buildings on the National Register of Historic Places in Florida
Chicago school architecture in Florida
Commercial buildings completed in 1908
1908 establishments in Florida